General elections were held in Liechtenstein between 9 and 11 February 2001. The result was a victory for the Progressive Citizens' Party, which won 13 of the 25 seats in the Landtag. Voter turnout was 86.72%.

Results

By electoral district

References

Liechtenstein
2001 in Liechtenstein
Elections in Liechtenstein
February 2001 events in Europe